Airtight is a fictional character from the G.I. Joe: A Real American Hero toyline, comic books and animated series. He is the G.I. Joe Team's hostile environment specialist and debuted in 1985.

Profile
His real name is Kurt Schnurr and his rank is that of corporal E-4. Airtight was born in New Haven, Connecticut.

Airtight was a misfit kid, who was known for his collection of plastic dinosaurs, and being able to hold his breath the longest. He grew up into the type of adult, who would wade into a cloud of toxic gas strong enough to dissolve lung tissue with one whiff. He is a trained expert in chemical weaponry, and is able to detect, identify, neutralize and contain viruses and poisons. His primary military specialty is CBR (Chemical, Biological and Radiological Warfare), and his secondary military specialty is ordnance. He is noted for being a practical joker, but his actions during battle make up for this reputation.

When the G.I. Joe team temporarily disbanded, Airtight returned to duty in the US Army as a CBR Warfare Specialist, and was eventually promoted to Sergeant E-5. He has been called back to active reserve status upon reinstatement of the team, in the event his skills are needed for a future mission.

Toys
Airtight was first released as an action figure in 1985. A Brazilian version of Airtight known as Ar Puro was released in 1990. A version of Airtight was released in India in 1993 and again in 2002.

A new version of Airtight was released in 2008 as a "Direct to Consumer" figure for the G.I. Joe 25th Anniversary line.

Comics

Marvel Comics
In the Marvel Comics G.I. Joe series, he first appeared in issue #44 (February 1986). There he is part of a training mission in the Nevada desert for prospective Joes being conducted by Lady Jaye. When the group is attacked by Cobra forces using new mutant plant spores, Airtight uses battery acid to destroy the spores. He also uses some scorpions he had been collecting to attack Destro and Doctor Mindbender.

Airtight next participated in the mission to steal a Soviet laser from Afghanistan. He also participates in the assault on Springfield. He later worked at Fort Wadsworth, monitoring satellite images of Cobra Island.

He is featured in the second issue of the Special Missions series, as part of a team sent to neutralize recently discovered World War II weaponry. A plane, hanging half-off the side of the glacier, threatens to release a toxic cloud that endanger many innocent lives. He works closely with Alpine and Snow Job. Airtight joins another group of Joes in the sewers below New York City. They fail to prevent the Dreadnoks from establishing a telemarketing base. A homeless veteran who was guiding the team gives up his life to save Airtight and the others from a perceived weapon.

When Cobra later invades The Pit, G.I. Joe's headquarters, Airtight and Barbecue fend off a squad of Laser Vipers. The two retreat when Battle Android Troopers are called into play. Much later, Airtight is part of a team of Joes sent to investigate the Cobra occupied town of Millville.

Action Force
In the Action Force continuity, Kurt Schnurr was born in Munich, West Germany. In issue #6, he helps save the Eiffel Tower from destruction at the hands of a male and female Crimson Guard duo. Airtight and Barbecue also successfully stop a run-away train full of radioactive materials, saving many innocent people.

Devil's Due
In the Devil's Due G.I. Joe series, Flash, Beach Head, Tripwire and Airtight become involved in the fight against Tyler Wingfield, a murderous militia leader. They also come into conflict with Chuckles, an undercover G.I. Joe agent, who had managed to infiltrate Wingfield's operation. All four Joes are captured, and Chuckles is ordered to kill one; no Joe actually dies.

Airtight also appears in issue #26, and #36, of the main Devil's Due series. Airtight and other Joes are later seen fighting Cobra forces in Iran, during the World War III storyline.

Animated series

Sunbow
Airtight first appeared in the Sunbow G.I. Joe episode "Rendezvous in the City of the Dead", the second part of "The Pyramid of Darkness" miniseries. In the Sunbow series, he was portrayed as a science geek. He uses his scientific knowledge to the Joes' advantage in a few episodes. For example, in "The Greenhouse Effect", he develops a weed spray that the Joes use against mutated plants wreaking havoc in Chicago. In "The Germ", Airtight tries to destroy a monstrous bacteria using antibiotics, only to make it grow stronger, but later thinks of a plan to kill the bacteria with poison, which proves successful.

In the two-part episode "Worlds Without End", he is one of the Joes that are sent to an alternate reality in which Cobra has defeated G.I. Joe and conquered the world.

Airtight is featured in a G.I. Joe PSA, in which he explains what to do if someone faints.

G.I. Joe: The Movie
Airtight also appeared briefly in the 1987 animated film G.I. Joe: The Movie.

Renegades
Airtight appeared in the G.I. Joe: Renegades episode "The Anaconda Strain." Dr. Kurt Schnurr is a scientist who was working with Dr. Monev on the Anaconda Strain for Cobra Industries and hoped that Cobra Industries will allow an antidote to be made. When he ended up infected, he had to be quarantined. When the Joes in hazmat suits infiltrate the facility (after being hired by Kurt's daughter Elena) and found him in the quarantine area, they found him with the Anaconda Strain's symptoms. Kurt then shows that the rat carrier is still alive. When the Joes learn of the cure in BioVault C, they break the glass to get Kurt to the Anaconda Strain Antidote, causing the company to go under lock-down. En route, they discover that his partner Monev orchestrated Kurt's infection as a part of Cobra Industries' plot to release the Anaconda Strain onto the populace and sell the antidote. As the Anaconda Strain virus starts to take its toll, Snake Eyes sprays the antidote on Kurt, Duke, and the rat carrier. Kurt and Elena head to L.A. via commercial jet airliner, to live with Kurt's cousin. Although cured, Kurt is now a carrier. Scarlett and Snake Eyes catch up to him, just as Kurt jumps from the plane to prevent infecting others. Snake Eyes dives after him with a parachute. The Anaconda-Strain virus has already spread to the passengers, so Scarlett feeds the antidote into the plane's oxygen system. Kurt vows to perfect a permanent antidote for the Anaconda Strain virus, Elena vows to help him. During the final scene of the episode, he is shown wearing a green and yellow outfit similar to that of the original character. Unlike in previous versions however, the suit is not to protect himself but to protect others from him, and the word "Airtight" is lettered on the arms of the suit.

Video games
Airtight is one of the featured characters in the Action Force II computer game.

Other media
Airtight is one of the featured supporting characters in the Find Your Fate G.I. Joe book "Operation: Star Raider".

References

External links
 Airtight at JMM's G.I. Joe Comics Home Page

Fictional characters from Connecticut
Fictional corporals
Fictional military sergeants
Fictional scientists
Fictional United States Army personnel
Male characters in animated series
Male characters in comics
G.I. Joe soldiers
Television characters introduced in 1985